Albert Sigmund Gustav Döderlein (5 July 1860, Augsburg – 10 December 1941, Munich) was a German obstetrician and gynecologist. He was the father of gynecologist Gustav Döderlein.

Biography 
He studied medicine at the University of Erlangen, and from 1893 to 1897 was an associate professor of gynecology and obstetrics at the University of Leipzig. Afterwards, he was a full professor at the Universities of Groningen (1897), Tübingen (from 1897 to 1907) and Munich (from 1907 to 1934).

Contributions 
He is considered one the founders of gynecological bacteriology. He was among the first to use radiotherapeutics in cancer therapy and is credited with introducing rubber gloves in obstetrics and gynecology. His name is associated with the Döderlein vaginal bacillus, a large, gram-positive bacterium that he first described in 1892.

Published works 
 Leitfaden für den geburtshilflichen Operationskurs, Leipzig 1893.
 Über Vergangenheit und Gegenwart der Geburtshülfe, Leipzig 1897.
 Operative Gynäkologie, Leipzig 1905; (with Bernhard Krönig).
 Handbuch der Geburtshilfe, 4 volumes, Wiesbaden 1915–1921.

References

External links
 

1860 births
1941 deaths
19th-century German physicians
German obstetricians
German gynaecologists
Physicians from Augsburg
Academic staff of the Ludwig Maximilian University of Munich